Diana Brenes (born 16 February 1997) is a Costa Rican judoka. She is a bronze medalist at the Pan American Games and a three-time bronze medalist at the Pan American Judo Championships.

Career 

At the 2019 Pan American Games held in Lima, Peru, she won one of the bronze medals in the women's 78 kg event. In that same year, she also competed in the women's 78 kg event at the 2019 World Judo Championships held in Tokyo, Japan.

In 2020, she won one of the bronze medals in the women's 78 kg event at the 2020 Pan American Judo Championships held in Guadalajara, Mexico.

Achievements

References

External links 
 

Living people
1997 births
Place of birth missing (living people)
Costa Rican female judoka
Judoka at the 2019 Pan American Games
Medalists at the 2019 Pan American Games
Pan American Games medalists in judo
Pan American Games bronze medalists for Costa Rica
21st-century Costa Rican women